Testour is a small town located in the north of Tunisia. It was known during the Roman period, as Tichilla, which means the green grass as it is situated in the mouth of Siliana valley. It was rebuilt in the 1500s by Muslim and Jewish refugees from Andalusia who gave it a distinctive character in building and layout. Today it is a popular pilgrimage for Jews who visit Rabbi Fraji Chawat's tomb.

The city host an international festival of Malouf and traditional Maghrebi music since 1967.

Twin towns – sister cities
Testour is twinned with:
  Chefchaouen, Morocco
  Serpa, Portugal
  Gibellina, Italy

External links
 Overview of Testour
  Guide of Testour

Communes of Tunisia
Populated places in Béja Governorate
Cities in Tunisia